Varnashramam is a 2023 Indian Tamil-language drama film directed by Sukumar Alagarswamy and starring Ramakrishnan and Cynthia Lourde, the film's producer, in the lead roles. It was released on 10 February 2023.

Cast 

Ramakrishnan as Ramanujam
Cynthia Lourde as Kanya
Amir
Vyshnavi Raj
Nimi Manuel 
Sriram Karthik 
Kuhasini 
Vasudevan 
Uma Maheshwari
Vishnu Bala 
Vandhana
A. P. Rathnavel
Thozhar Ramanikanth

Production
US-based software engineer and philanthroper, Cynthia Lourde, came to Chennai to work as a singer on Tamil films. While in the city, she accepted terms to produce and act in a project directed by Sukumar Alagarsamy about honour killings.

Reception 
The film was released on 10 February 2023 across Tamil Nadu. A critic from Dina Thanthi gave the film a mixed review, while praising director Sukumar's motivations behind making the film. A critic from Dinakaran gave the film a negative review, citing the director could have conceived the climax differently. A reviewer from Virakesari gave the film two out of five stars, citing the film was best avoided.

References

External links 
 

 2023 films
 2020s Tamil-language films